Japanese industry leaders began to turn their manufacturing establishment around after World War II  under the United States-led Allied occupation.

The American Occupation's Industrial Consultancy 
The most popular Japanese radio program in the 1950s is reputed to have been "Quality for Foremen."  This emphasis on shop-floor leadership began through the intervention of three civil communications engineers who were part of the American occupation: Frank Polkinghorn, Charles Protzman, both from AT&T, and Homer Sarasohn of MIT's Radiation Laboratory, who headed the occupation's Civil Communications Section (CCS).
The Japanese had been trying to introduce scientific management practices, common in America, since 1913, and their failure to make changes contributed to their losing World War II. Japanese industries' leadership had been purged by the MacArthur occupation.  This removed 2 obstacles to change: the rigid social stratification of business (which meant that communication flowed one way only), and the lack of technical qualifications in both management and the workforce.  Japanese management, according to Bunzaemon Inoue (late President of Sumitomo Rubber) was "all line, no staff."  The CCS section introduced seminars for electronics industry leaders in 1949, and expanded versions of these CCS Seminars as they were called, may have stimulated some of the interest in the "Quality for Foreman" show.

The KACHO System 
According to Kenneth Hopper, the Japanese were attempting to copy the American practice of "bottom up management,"  although the CCS seminar did not use the term which was introduced by Peter Drucker in the mid-1950s. The kacho system was evolved as the unique Japanese way of moving responsibility to the lowest acceptable level.  "Essentially a kacho is responsible for an area of  activity.  In a large factory making electrical consumer goods, he might be in charge of white goods... production in all its aspects. ... the strength of the kacho system [is that one person] knows or should know everything that goes on beneath, alongside and above him...: company policy, research, relations with customers and suppliers, information about the competition, and all activities on the shop floor."

The CCS seminar was developed in 1949 and presented by the Americans in Tokyo; a second session was held in Osaka in 1950, and these were the models that were taken up by Nikkeiren, the Japanese employers' association. Their training events continued until 1974. Other vital elements of the CCS seminars included:
flexibility, decentralization, and cross-departmental teamwork.

Other American Seminars and Leaders 

Hopper further notes that a lecture series on statistical quality control by W. Edwards Deming (also in 1950)  and the work of Joseph M. Juran were also vital elements of what came to be known as the Japanese economic miracle.  While this comment in no way resolves a  controversy about  the genesis of Japan’s postwar industrial resurrection, his discussion throws light on the chronology of  Western contributions to that effort.

References

External links 
 http://ccdl.libraries.claremont.edu/cdm/ref/collection/khp/id/1791 by Ken Hopper

Manufacturing in Japan
Economic history of Japan
Industry in Japan